Laurance Lyon (1875 – 12 November 1932) was a British Conservative Party politician

He was elected Member of Parliament for Hastings at the 1918 general election, but resigned his seat in the House of Commons on 13 April 1921.

References

External links 
 
 

1875 births
1932 deaths
Conservative Party (UK) MPs for English constituencies
UK MPs 1918–1922